The following is a timeline of the history of the city of Messina, Sicily, Italy.

Prior to 18th century

 730 BCE - Chalcidians take settlement from the Siculi; town renamed "Zancle".
 671 BCE - Samians take Zancle.
 397 BCE - Settlement sacked by Carthaginian forces in the Battle of Messene.
 343 BCE - Carthaginians ousted by forces of Timoleon.
 282 BCE - Mamertines take Messina (approximate date).
 241 BCE - Messina becomes a civitas foederata.
 35 BCE - Messina attacked by forces of Octavian.

 520 CE - Roman Catholic diocese of Messina active (approximate date).
 535 CE - Belisarius of the Byzantine Empire takes Sicily.
 843 - Arabs in power.
 1061 - Normans in power.
 1098 - Messina Cathedral construction begins.
 1190 - Messina sacked by forces of Richard I of England.
 1194 - Henry VI, Holy Roman Emperor in power in Sicily.
 1197 - Messina Cathedral consecrated.
 1232
 Messina issues gold coin.
 Economic unrest.
 1282
 Uprising against Anjou rule.
 Spanish rule begins.
 1296 -  begins.
 ca.1430 - Birth of Antonello da Messina a painter.
 1473 - Printing press in operation.
 1535 - Entry of Charles V, Holy Roman Emperor into Messina.
 1545 - Forte Gonzaga (fort) built.
 1546 - Forte del Santissimo Salvatore (fort) built.
 1548 -  founded.
 1616 - Palazzo del Monte di Pietà (Messina) built.
 1638 - Orto Botanico "Pietro Castelli" dell'Università di Messina (garden) established.
 1674 - Messina revolt against Spanish rule begins.
 1686 - Real Cittadella (fort) built.
 1693 - 1693 Sicily earthquake.

18th-19th centuries
 1713 - Spanish rule ends.
 1728 - Accademia Peloritana dei Pericolanti (learned society) founded.
 1743 - Plague.
 1757 -  (monument) erected.
 1783 - Earthquake.
 1806 - Museum opens.
 1838 - University of Messina established.
 1848 -  during the Sicilian revolution of 1848.
 1850 - Population: 97,074.
 1854
 State Archive of Messina established.
 Cholera outbreak.
 1860 - July: Garibaldi enters city.
 1866 - Railway station opens.
 1871
 Ferrovia Messina-Siracusa (railway) in operation.
 Population: 111,854.
 1881 - Population: 126,497. 
 1889
 Ferrovia Palermo-Messina (railway) begins operating.
 Messina Marittima railway station opens.
 1890 -  begins operating.
 1892 - First section of  begins operating.
 1896 -  begins operating.
 1900 - Messina Football Club formed.

20th century

 1908 - 28 December: 1908 Messina earthquake.
 1911 - Population: 126,557.
 1921 - Population: 177,196.
 1932 - Stadio Giovanni Celeste (stadium) opens.
 1935 - Archivio Storico Comunale (city archives) established.
 1936 - Population: 191,966.
 1943 - City bombed in the Allied invasion of Sicily during World War II.
 1952 - Gazzetta del Sud newspaper begins publication.
 1955
 June: International conference on European economic integration held in Messina.
 Pylons erected in the Strait of Messina to hold an electric power line.
 1959 - Messina Grand Prix (car race) begins.
 1979 - International Rally of Messina (car race) begins.
 1985 - March:  held.

21st century
 2003 - Tram begins operating.
 2004 - Stadio San Filippo (stadium) opens.
 2009
 October: 2009 Messina floods and mudslides.
 Palazzo della cultura built.
 2010 - S.S.D. Città di Messina (football club) formed.
 2013
 June: Local election held; Renato Accorinti becomes mayor.
 Population: 242,267.
 2018 - Local election held; Cateno De Luca becomes mayor.
 2022 - Local election held; Federico Basile becomes mayor.

See also
 Messina history
 
 List of mayors of Messina
 History of Sicily
 Timelines of other cities in the macroregion of Insular Italy:(it)
 Sardinia: Timeline of Cagliari 
 Sicily: Timeline of Catania, Palermo, Syracuse, Trapani

References

This article incorporates information from the Italian Wikipedia.

Bibliography

in English
 
 
 
 
  + 1867 ed.

in Italian

External links

 Items related to Messina, various dates (via Europeana)
 Items related to Messina, various dates (via Digital Public Library of America)

Messina
Messina
messina